Suddenly is a song created for the 2012 film adaptation of the 1980 musical Les Misérables, included in both the film itself and the related soundtrack album. It was nominated for an Academy Award for Best Original Song in 2012.

Production
When reading the book in preparation for the film, Tom Hooper realised that one major thing missing was an acknowledgment of the importance of Cosette's love to Valjean, as well as his accepting of fatherhood. Claude-Michel Schonberg said that this moment, "only a camera can catch", adding that "It's a feeling he never had before... on stage, it's very difficult to catch the intimacy of this moment."

Universal Pictures president of film music and publishing Mike Knobloch explains that Hooper "went to Claude-Michel Schonberg and Alain and Herbert and said, 'If we were going to do a new song, what if it were there? What if Jean Valjean sang a song that helped the audience understand that this is a big moment for him?' Herbert was the first to suggest the title 'Suddenly,' as in he suddenly realizes his value and purpose. He went to Alain and they brought it to life quickly."

It replaces a set of dialogue that appeared in the musical after Valjean acquires Cosette from the Thenardiers, and before the 9-year jump:

There has been speculation by news outlets such as BroadwayWorld that the song "may be added to the stage show at some point."

Synopsis
The song "beautifully explains what happens when Valjean takes Cosette from the inn and looks after her".

Composition
The song is performed by Jean Valjean, played by Hugh Jackman in the film version. Music is by Claude-Michel Schonberg, while the lyrics are by Herbert Kretzmer and Alain Boublil. A reprise of the song is performed by Marius and Cosette toward the end of the film. The song has been described as "lullaby-like".

Performance
The song and its reprise debuted in the 2012 Tom Hooper-directed adaptation of Les Misérables.

Hugh Jackman performed the song as part of a Les Misérables medley at the 85th Academy Awards.

Release
The song appears only on Les Misérables: Highlights from the Motion Picture Soundtrack.

Critical reception
Scott Ross of NBC Bay Area said the song "fits seamlessly into the fabric of the musical". The Week said the song was "pretty forgettable compared to the film's more famous songs."

Awards and nominations

References

2012 songs
Hugh Jackman songs
Songs from musicals
Songs with lyrics by Herbert Kretzmer
Works based on Les Misérables